The Drei Kaiserberge (lit. three emperor-mountains) Hohenstaufen (684 meters), Rechberg (707 meters) and Stuifen (757 meters) are inlier mountains of the Swabian Alb in Baden-Württemberg, Germany. They form a distinctive group between Göppingen and Schwäbisch Gmünd and are a widely visible and prominent feature of the region. Since 4 October 1971, they have been protected together with Aasrücken and Rehgebirge as a Landschaftsschutzgebiet (landscape conservation area).

The name Kaiserberge references Hohenstaufen Castle, the family seat of the royal and imperial family Staufer. Its remains can be seen today at the top of Hohenstaufen.

The Kaiserberge are depicted in the city logos of Göppingen and Waldstetten.

The route of the yearly marathon Albmarathon runs over all three mountains.

References 

Mountains and hills of Baden-Württemberg